Apaza is a surname. Notable people with the surname include:
  (born 1992), Argentinian association football player
 Gregoria Apaza (1751–1782), Bolivian indigenous leader
 Máxima Apaza (born 1960), Bolivian Indigenous activist and politician
 René Fernández Apaza (1924–2013), Bolivian Roman Catholic archbishop